Léopold Zborowski (1889–1932) was a Polish poet, writer and art dealer. He was born in Zaleszczyki into a Jewish family.

Zborowski and his wife Anna (Hanka Zborowska) were contemporaries with Parisian artists such as Chaïm Soutine, André Derain and Amedeo Modigliani, who painted Zborowski's portraits.

Léopold Zborowski was Amedeo Modigliani's primary art dealer and friend during the artist's final years, organizing his expositions and letting the Leghorn (Livorno) artist use his house as an atelier. He also was the first art dealer of René Iché, Chaïm Soutine, Maurice Utrillo, Émile Savitry, Marc Chagall and André Derain. There are three portraits of him by Modigliani, such as a 17″ by 10″ artwork sold for $1,464,000 at Sotheby's in 2003.

As Modigliani's art dealer, Zborowski accumulated a small fortune, which he lost during the Great Depression of the 1930s, ultimately dying poor in Paris in 1932 of a heart attack. His widow was forced to sell his whole collection, which is now completely dispersed.

References 

1889 births
1932 deaths
Polish art dealers
19th-century Polish Jews
Polish male poets
Jewish poets
20th-century Polish poets
20th-century Polish male writers
Polish patrons of the arts
Polish emigrants to France